
Year 838 (DCCCXXXVIII) was a common year starting on Tuesday (link will display the full calendar) of the Julian calendar.

Events 
 By place 

 Byzantine Empire
 July 22 – Battle of Dazimon: Caliph Al-Mu'tasim launches a major punitive expedition against the Byzantine Empire, targeting the two major Byzantine fortress cities of central Anatolia (Ancyra and Amorium). He mobilises a vast army (80,000 men) at Tarsus, which is divided into two main forces. The northern force, under commander Al-Afshin, invades the Armeniac Theme from the region of Melitene, joining up with the forces of the city's emir, Umar al-Aqta. The southern, main force, under Al-Mu'tasim, passes the Cilician Gates into Cappadocia. Emperor Theophilos attacks the Abbasids, inflicting 3,000 casualties, but is later heavily defeated by a counter-attack of 10,000 Turkish horse archers. Theophilos and his guard are encircled, and barely manage to break through and escape.Haldon 2001, p. 80.
 August – Siege of Amorium: The Abbasids besiege the Byzantine fortress city of Amorium, which is protected by 44 towers, according to the contemporary geographer Ibn Khordadbeh. Both besiegers and besieged have many siege engines, and for several days both sides exchange missile fire. However, a Muslim prisoner defects to Al-Mu'tasim, and informs him about a place in the wall which has been badly damaged by heavy rainfall. The Abbasids concentrate their hits on this section, and after two days manage to breach the city wall. After two weeks of repeated attacks, the Byzantine defenders surrender. The city is sacked and plundered, 70,000 inhabitants are slaughtered, and the survivors are sold as slaves.

 Europe 
 King Pepin I of Aquitaine dies after a 21-year reign. Emperor Louis the Pious appoints his youngest son Charles the Bald as his successor. The Aquitainian nobility, however, elects Pepin's son Pepin II as the new Frankish ruler.

 Britain 
 Battle of Hingston Down: The West Saxons, led by King Egbert of Wessex, defeat a combined force of Cornish and Danish Vikings, at Hingston Down in Cornwall.
 King Fedelmid mac Crimthainn of Munster calls for a great royal meeting at Cluain-Conaire-Tommain, between himself and King Niall Caille mac Áeda of Uí Néill.
 Approximate date – The Stone of Destiny, an oblong block of red sandstone, is placed at Scone Palace for the coronation of the first monarchs of Scotland.

 Abbasid Caliphate 
 A conspiracy is discovered, led by General 'Ujayf ibn 'Anbasa, to assassinate Al-Mu'tasim while he is campaigning, and place his nephew Al-Abbas ibn al-Ma'mun on the throne. A widespread purge of the army follows, which cements the leading role of the Turkish slave-soldiers (ghilman) in the Abbasid military establishment.
 Babak Khorramdin, an Iranian military leader, is executed by order of al-Mu'tasim.
 The Yezidi rise up against the Abbasids (approximate date).

 By topic 
 Religion 
 The oldest known mention is made of the city of Rheine, on the Ems River (modern Germany).
 The Khazars are converted to Judaism (approximate date).

Births 
 Æthelswith, Anglo-Saxon queen (approximate date)
 Fujiwara no Takafuji, Japanese nobleman (d. 900)
 Ubaydallah ibn Abdallah, Muslim governor (approximate date)

Deaths 
 November 6 – Li Yong, prince of the Tang Dynasty
 Al-Abbas ibn al-Ma'mun, Muslim prince and general
 Babak Khorramdin, Iranian leader of the Khurramite uprising against the Abbasid Caliphate
 Boniface II, margrave of Tuscany (approximate date)
 Bran mac Fáeláin, king of Leinster (Ireland)
 Eadhun, bishop of Winchester
 Frederick of Utrecht, Frisian bishop (approximate date)
 Pepin I of Aquitaine, king of Aquitaine (b. 797)
 Ralpacan, king of Tibet (approximate date)
 Ratimir, duke of Lower Pannonia
 'Ujayf ibn 'Anbasa, Muslim general
 Willerich, bishop of Bremen
 Ziyadat Allah I, Muslim emir

References